Carl Gustaf Oscar Fredrik Christian, Prince Bernadotte (10 January 1911 – 27 June 2003), originally Prince Carl, Duke of Östergötland, was the youngest child and only son of Prince Carl of Sweden and Princess Ingeborg of Denmark and eventually a prince of the Belgian nobility. To distinguish himself from his father, he was widely known as Carl Junior. He was the brother of Princess Margaretha of Sweden, Queen Astrid of Belgium and Crown Princess Märtha of Norway.

Marriage and loss of status
When Prince Carl married Countess Elsa von Rosen (1904–1991), on 6 July 1937 at Kvillinge, Sweden, he had to relinquish his succession rights and his royal titles. She was the daughter of one Count von Rosen and ex-wife of another Count von Rosen. Bernadotte's brother-in-law, King Leopold III of the Belgians, conferred upon him the title of Prince Bernadotte in the Belgian nobility on the same date, with the right to a comital title for his male-line descendants. They had one daughter, called Countess Madeleine Bernadotte (born Stockholm, 8 October 1938), and were divorced in 1951. Through his daughter he was grandfather of Belgian actress Astrid Whettnall.

He married secondly Ann Margareta Larsson (1921–1975) at Danderyd, Sweden, on 1 November 1954. They divorced in 1961 without issue. His third and final marriage took place at the Embassy of Sweden in Rabat, Morocco, on 8 June 1978, when he married Kristine Rivelsrud.

Bernadotte died at the age of 92 on 27 June 2003 in Málaga, Spain. He was the last surviving grandchild of Oscar II of Sweden and the last surviving great-grandchild of Oscar I of Sweden. His widow, Princess Kristine Bernadotte, died at their home at Villa Capricornio in Benalmadena, Spain, on 4 November 2014 at the age of 82, without issue.

The Huseby scandal
Carl Bernadotte was at the centre of the Huseby scandal that occurred in the late 1950s in Sweden amidst a great deal of publicity. Bernadotte and other suspects had gained the trust of Florence Stephens, a wealthy elderly heiress of a large estate near Växjö in southern Sweden. A complex set of criminal transactions led to the ruin of Stephens and brought Bernadotte and the others to court. Bernadotte was acquitted, in spite of his full confession – it was considered that he had no criminal intent. Bernadotte left Sweden shortly after the trial and spent the rest of his life in Spain.

Honours and arms

Honours 
 :
 Knight and Commander of the Royal Order of the Seraphim, 10 January 1911
 Knight of the Royal Order of Charles XIII, 10 January 1911
 
 : Grand Cordon of the Order of Leopold
 : Knight of the Order of the Elephant, 5 December 1933
 : Grand Cordon of the Order of the Rising Sun
 : Grand Cross of the Royal Norwegian Order of Saint Olav, with Collar, 19 March 1929

Arms

Ancestry

References

1911 births
2003 deaths
Carl 1911
Carl, Prince Bernadotte
Carl, Prince Bernadotte
Carl, Prince Bernadotte
Carl
Disinherited European royalty
Swedish unintroduced nobility
Swedish Lutherans
People from Stockholm
Dukes of Östergötland
Knights of the Order of Charles XIII
Grand Cordons of the Order of the Rising Sun